Alessandro Vanotti (born 16 September 1980 in Bergamo) is an Italian former professional road bicycle racer.

Vanotti rode the Tour de France twice, in 2006 and 2009. He left  at the end of the 2012 season and joined  on a two-year contract from the 2013 season onwards.

Major results

2003
 3rd Trofeo Franco Balestra
 5th Gran Premio Industria e Commercio Artigianato Carnaghese
2005
 9th GP Triberg-Schwarzwald
2007
 Settimana Ciclistica Lombarda
1st Prologue (TTT) & 4
 1st Stage 1 (TTT) Giro d'Italia
2008
 1st Stage 1b (TTT) Settimana Internazionale di Coppi e Bartali
 1st Stage 1 (TTT) Vuelta a España
2010
 1st Stage 1b (TTT) Settimana Internazionale di Coppi e Bartali
 1st Stage 4 (TTT) Giro d'Italia
2013
 1st Stage 1 (TTT) Vuelta a España
2015
 1st Stage 2 (TTT) Vuelta a Burgos
2016
 1st  Mountains classification Tour of Austria
 1st Stage 2 (TTT) Vuelta a Burgos

Grand Tour general classification results timeline

References

External links

Living people
Italian male cyclists
1980 births
Cyclists from Bergamo
European Games competitors for Italy
Cyclists at the 2015 European Games